Reunification of Gran Colombia refers to the potential future reunification of Colombia, Venezuela, Ecuador, and Panama under a single government. There have been attempts of reunification since 1903, when Panama separated from Colombia. People in favor for a reunification are called "unionistas" or unionists. In 2008, Hugo Chávez, president of Venezuela, announced the proposal of the political restoration of the Gran Colombia, under the Bolivarian revolution.

Today
Some commentators  believe that a reunified Gran Colombia could become a global economic powerhouse. That would contrast with Gran Colombia in the 1820s, whose economy was mostly agrarian and had little industry.

Gran Colombia would have the world's 14th largest economy behind South Korea and the 12th largest population behind Mexico. By 2050, Gran Colombia would have nearly 150 million citizens. Gran Colombia would also be the world's 10th largest nation by size.

See also
 Central American reunification

References

Gran Colombia
Proposed political unions